Leury Isabel Basanta Gil (born 7 April 1993) is a Venezuelan footballer who plays as a midfielder for Colombian club América de Cali. She has been a member of the Venezuela women's national team.

International career
Basanta played for Venezuela at senior level in the 2014 Copa América Femenina and the 2014 Central American and Caribbean Games.

International goals
Scores and results list Venezuela's goal tally first

References

1993 births
Living people
Women's association football midfielders
Women's association football forwards
Venezuelan women's footballers
People from Ciudad Bolívar
Venezuela women's international footballers
Competitors at the 2014 Central American and Caribbean Games
Deportivo Anzoátegui players
Atlético Bucaramanga footballers
Venezuelan expatriate women's footballers
Venezuelan expatriate sportspeople in Colombia
Expatriate women's footballers in Colombia